Llewela Davies (February 1871 – 22 August 1952) was a Welsh pianist and composer who toured with Dame Nellie Melba.

Early life and education
Llewela Tegwedd Davies was born at Talgarth, near Brecon, in South Wales. Her father was Rhys Davies, a justice of the peace. At age 10 she won a medal and a cash prize at the National Eisteddfod, and earned a scholarship to attend the North London Collegiate School for Girls.

She attended the Royal Academy of Music on a John Thomas Welsh scholarship awarded in 1887, and as a student there won many awards for composition and musicianship, including the "Worshipful Company of Musicians Medal for the Most Distinguished Student in the Academy." As a pianist Llewela Davies was often an accompanist for student vocal recitals during her college years. She later earned a music degree from London University.

Her instructor at the Royal Academy, Walter Macfarren, was the brother of composer George Alexander Macfarren and brother-in-law of composer Emma Maria Macfarren; his other students included notable musicians Agnes Zimmermann, Dora Bright, and Stewart Macpherson.

Career
Llewela Davies' most prominent performances were with Nellie Melba; Davies and her husband toured with the singer, though North America, Australia, and New Zealand.  She performed twice at the Three Choirs Festival, and as a pianist at the National Eisteddfod. She also performed at the Annual Reid Concert in Edinburgh in 1899. She was welcomed in Welsh villages as a guest performer at special events.

Davies taught at London University after earning her degree there. Compositions by Llewela Davies include Three Sketches (for orchestra), a string quartet, and a sonata for violin and piano.

Personal life
Miss Davies married fellow Welsh musician Frederic Griffith (or Griffiths) in 1898, and lived in London thereafter. She was widowed when Frederic Griffith died in 1917. She died in London in 1952.

References

1871 births
1952 deaths
Welsh composers
Welsh women pianists
Alumni of the Royal Academy of Music
People educated at North London Collegiate School
People from Brecon
19th-century Welsh musicians
19th-century British women musicians
19th-century British composers
19th-century pianists
20th-century Welsh musicians
20th-century British composers
20th-century British women musicians
20th-century British pianists
20th-century women composers
19th-century women composers
19th-century women pianists
20th-century women pianists